Vincent Deeney (January 23, 1915 – June 25, 1999) was an American rower. He competed in the men's coxed pair event at the 1948 Summer Olympics.

References

External links
 

1915 births
1999 deaths
American male rowers
Olympic rowers of the United States
Rowers at the 1948 Summer Olympics
Rowers from Philadelphia